Datum Peak is a peak  high near the southwest extremity of Hobbs Ridge, rising above the south side of Gauss Glacier,  west of Williams Peak, in Victoria Land. The name is one of a group in the area associated with surveying applied in 1993 by the New Zealand Geographic Board. It was named from datum (a practical representation of a reference system), a geodesy and surveying term defined by fixed coordinates.

References 

Mountains of Victoria Land
Scott Coast